Gallows is the third album by English hardcore punk band Gallows and the first full-length to feature new lead vocalist Wade Macneil, who replaced original frontman Frank Carter in August 2011, when Carter left to form new band Pure Love. It is also the last album to feature guitarist Steph Carter.

The album was produced, mixed and mastered by Spycatcher members Thomas Mitchener and Steve Sears at Watford's Broadfields Studio and was released on 10 September 2012 via the band's new label Venn Records in partnership with PIAS Recordings. The album will also be released and distributed in the United States through Bridge Nine Records and in Australia and New Zealand through Halfcut Records/Shock Records.

Track listing

Personnel
 Wade Macneil – lead vocals
 Laurent "Lags" Barnard – guitar, backing vocals, keyboards
 Steph Carter – guitar, backing vocals
 Stuart Gili-Ross – bass, backing vocals
 Lee Barratt – drums, percussion

References 

Bridge 9 Records albums
Gallows (band) albums
2012 albums